Faya (formerly spelled FYA) are a female R&B duo from West London. Originally a trio, the group was founded in Slough, England, and were signed to a six-album deal with Def Jam Recordings in 2003. They are best known for their 2004 single "Must Be Love", which featured guest vocals from Smujji and peaked at number 13 on the UK Singles Chart. This was followed by a second single, "Too Hot", and an album, For Your Attention, which was certified gold in Japan.

History
FYA (standing for "For Your Attention") originally had three members: Kezia (Kizzy) Bennett, Tenza Foster and Emma Nhamburo. Nhamburo, originally from Harare in Zimbabwe, and Foster, who originated from Montego Bay in Jamaica, met Bennett and formed FYA in Slough. They were discovered performing at a Slough youth centre and released their debut single, "Boops '03"—a cover of "Boops (Here to Go)" by Sly and Robbie—in November 2003.

After the release of "Boops '03", FYA were signed to a six-album deal with Def Jam Recordings. This was followed by a second single, "Must Be Love", which was released in March 2004. The strength of this single allowed FYA to be featured alongside acts such as Franz Ferdinand and Natasha Bedingfield as part of a BBC Radio 1 series on new British music. "Must Be Love" featured vocals from guest singer Smujji and peaked at No. 13 on the UK Singles Chart, making it FYA's biggest chart hit. It sold 100,000 copies worldwide and was licensed to more than fifteen countries.

Following the success of "Must Be Love", FYA released a third single, "Too Hot", in July 2004. The song did not sell as well as "Must Be Love", and peaked at No. 49 on the UK Singles Chart. The band were subsequently dropped by Def Jam, and instead released their debut album, For Your Attention, through the label Jamdown in 2005. For Your Attention was also released in Japan by Toshiba EMI, where it reached gold certification. A second album, Feel the Heat, was released by Universal Music in 2007, with the track "Season on Fire" being taken from it as a single. After Bennett left the group, Foster and Nhamburo continued to perform together under the name Faya, and are currently based in West London.

Discography

Studio albums

Singles

See also
List of former Def Jam Recordings artists

References

External links 

Faya on Myspace
FYA at AllMusic

English pop girl groups
British contemporary R&B musical groups
British reggae musical groups
British R&B girl groups
British dancehall musicians
English pop music duos
Contemporary R&B duos
Black British musical groups
Reggae fusion groups
Musical groups established in 2003
Musical groups from Berkshire
People from Slough
Female musical duos
Dancehall groups
Def Jam Recordings artists
Universal Music Group artists